The Tar Tunnel is an abandoned tunnel located on the north bank of the River Severn in the Ironbridge Gorge at Coalport, England. It is one of ten Ironbridge Gorge Museums attractions administered by the Ironbridge Gorge Museum Trust.

Miners struck a gushing spring of natural bitumen, a black treacle-like substance, when digging a canal tunnel for the Coalport Canal in 1787, or else digging a level in search of coal. The plan, proposed by William Reynolds, was to connect the canal alongside the River Severn to the lower galleries of the mines below the Blists Hill area. After digging around  into the hill the canal project was abandoned in favour of bitumen extraction.

The tunnel was a great curiosity in the eighteenth century and bitumen still oozes gently from the brick walls today.  Bitumen's chief commercial use at the time was to treat and weatherproof ropes and caulk wooden ships, but small amounts were processed and bottled as 'Betton's British Oil', a panacea remedy for rheumatism and scurvy. After the canal project was abandoned the Hay Inclined Plane was built instead, its base being alongside the canal basin.

In the past visitors were provided with hard hats and were able to enter the first  of the brick-lined tunnel as far as an iron gate. Electric lighting is provided. Due to a build up of gas in the tunnel, it is unsafe to enter but visitors can still get a view along part of its length from the entrance.

References

 www.shropshiretourism.info - Coalport Tar Tunnel

External links

 Tar Tunnel at Ironbridge Gorge Museums
 Pictures inside the Tar Tunnel

1787 establishments in England
Museums in Shropshire
Industry museums in England
Archaeological museums in England
Industrial archaeological sites in Shropshire
Tourist attractions in Shropshire
History of Shropshire
Tunnels in Shropshire
Ironbridge Gorge
Underground mines in England
Ironbridge Gorge Museum Trust
Tunnels completed in 1787
Disused tunnels